"Mizu no Naka no Answer" (Japanese: 水の中のAnswer) is the third single by Kiyotaka Sugiyama, released by VAP on May 27, 1987. The single reached #1 on the Oricon Singles Chart for 1987, earning him his first #1 spot since the Kiyotaka Sugiyama & Omega Tribe album First Finale.

Background and commercial 
The song was used as the commercial song for DyDo Drinko's "Jonian Coffee" with Sugiyama starring in the commercial. The commercial was shot in Hawaii with a scene of a person catching a ball. On the evening of the shoot, Sugiyama drank too much beer at the hotel he was staying at and suffered from diarrhea. Even after going to the toilet, he still  shot the remaining scenes.

At the time of the release, Sugiyama's affiliated office, Triangle Productions, prioritized the relationship between VAP and Nippon TV, so he always appeared on the program "The Top Ten." He never appeared on Tokyo Broadcasting System's program "The Best Ten."

A longer version of the song was included in the next single, "Shade," which also reached #1 in the same year.

Track listing

Charts

Weekly charts

Year-end charts

References 

1987 songs
Oricon Weekly number-one singles
1987 singles
Japanese pop songs